Harry Eagles (birth registered April→June 1860 – death registered January→March 1950) was an English rugby union footballer who played in the 1880s and 1890s. He played at representative level for British Isles, and Lancashire, and at club level for Crescent FC, and Salford, in the forwards.

Background
Harry Eagles' birth was registered in Chorlton, Lancashire, and his death aged 87 was registered in Fylde, Lancashire.

Domestic career 
Harry Eagles was selected for The North of England versus The South of England in all three matches in 1887 to 1890. Eagles also won cap(s) for Lancashire county while at Salford.

British Isles
Harry Eagles won cap(s) for British Isles while at Salford on the 1888 British Lions tour to New Zealand and Australia, while on the tour he played in all the British Isles' 54-matches; 35-matches of rugby union, and 19-matches of Victorian Rules Football (later known as Australian Rules Football).

References

External links
Search for "Eagles" at espn.co.uk (1888 British Isles tourists statistics missing (31 December 2017))
Statistics at lionsrugby.com
Football – British Football Team’s Visit To New Zealand.
The Return Of The English Team To Their Native Land
Football. A team of British Rugby footballers visited the colonies in April
Lions tour to Australia, 1888... and 2013

1860 births
1950 deaths
British & Irish Lions rugby union players from England
English rugby union players
Lancashire County RFU players
People from Chorlton-cum-Hardy
Rugby union forwards
Rugby union players from Lancashire
Salford Red Devils players